Telida (Tilaya-di or Tilayadi’ in Upper Kuskokwim) is an unincorporated community located in the Yukon-Koyukuk Census Area in the U.S. state of Alaska. At the 2010 census the population was 3, unchanged from 2000.

Geography 

The word Telida means 'whitefish' in the Upper Kuskokwim Athabaskan language.

History 
Athabascan folklore says that Telida's residents are descended from two sisters, survivors of an attack by another Athabascan group, who fled from the McKinley area to Telida Lake where they discovered whitefish at its outlet. The women were later discovered by stragglers from the attacking party, who married the women and settled at the lake. The village of Telida is named after the lake.

The village has been located in three different places. It was first visited by United States army explorers in 1899. When the Swift Fork changed course, the village was moved what is now called "Old Telida." A Russian Orthodox church, St. Basil the Great, was built in Old Telida in 1918. A roadhouse was also built during this period. In 1920-21, Old Telida was a stopping point on the trail between McGrath and Nenana and hundreds of people used the roadhouse. In 1935, Old Telida flooded and the remaining residents relocated to New Telida.

In 1958, a fire burned an area in which the villagers constructed an airstrip. Many families moved to Takotna during the school year and lived in Telida only during summer months. A school was built in Telida in the 1970s, but the population has declined to almost nothing since.

Demographics

Telida first appeared on the 1980 U.S. Census as a census-designated place (CDP). In 1990, it lost that designation and was reclassified as an unincorporated Alaskan Native Village Statistical Area (ANVSA).

Transportation
Telida Airport (IATA: TLF, FAA: 2K5) is a public use airport serving Telida.

Education
It was previously served by the Telida School of the Iditarod Area School District.

The Telida Current began publication after the school received a copy machine. It was later published using the Quill, software for literacy

References

External links
  - Revised January 2004

Unincorporated communities in Alaska
Unincorporated communities in Unorganized Borough, Alaska
Unincorporated communities in Yukon–Koyukuk Census Area, Alaska